Nanno was a comune (municipality) in Trentino in the northern Italian region Trentino-Alto Adige/Südtirol, located about  north of Trento. It was merged with Tassullo and Tuenno on January 1, 2016, to form a new municipality, Ville d'Anaunia.

Nanno borders the following municipalities: Tassullo, Tuenno, Terres, Flavon and Denno.

Demographic evolution

References

Cities and towns in Trentino-Alto Adige/Südtirol